Selenoprotein P is a protein that in humans is encoded by the SEPP1 gene.

This gene encodes a selenoprotein containing multiple selenocysteine (Sec) residues, which are encoded by the UGA codon that normally signals translation termination. The 3' UTR of selenoprotein genes have a common stem-loop structure, the sec insertion sequence (SECIS), which is necessary for the recognition of UGA as a Sec codon rather than as a stop signal. This selenoprotein is an extracellular glycoprotein, and is unusual in that it contains 10 Sec residues (human, rat, mouse) per polypeptide, one located at the C-terminal side of protein and others at the N-terminal side. It is a heparin-binding protein that appears to be associated with endothelial cells, and has been implicated to function as an antioxidant in the extracellular space. Several transcript variants, encoding either the same or different isoform, have been found for this gene.

Animal models 
Mice and dogs with knock-out variants in their SEPP1 homologues (Selenop and SELENOP respectively) may develop cerebellar ataxia phenotypes. SEPP1 and neural precursor cell levels in mouse brains increase post-exercise. Mice engineered to lack SEPP1 did not increase neural precursors.

See also 

 Selenium in biology

References

Further reading 

 
 
 
 
 
 
 
 
 
 
 
 
 
 
 

Selenoproteins